Number One is the debut album by American heavy metal band Pist.On (or Piston). It was first released in 1996 by Fierce Recordings/Futurist Label Group, before being repackaged and re-released by Atlantic Records on June 24, 1997.

Name change 
Another notable change, between the original album and the Atlantic version, is the spelling of the band's name, from Pist*On to simply Piston. The issue of the band having "sold out" to Atlantic became the focal point of their next album, titled .

Track listing 
All songs written by Henry Font, except "Shoplifters of the World Unite" (Morrissey/Marr, c. 1987)

 "Parole" – 3:43
 "Turbulent" – 3:37
 "Grey Flap" – 3:57
 "Shoplifters of the World Unite" (The Smiths cover) – 2:29
 "I Am No One" – 5:19
 "Eight Sides" – 3:50
 "I'm Afraid of Life" – 4:39
 "Electra Complex" – 2:56
 "Down & Out" – 3:42
 "Mix Me with Blood" – 2:52
 "My Feet" – 3:27
 "Exit Wound" – 4:56

Personnel

Original version 
 Henry Font – lead & backing vocals, rhythm guitar
 Paul Poulos – lead guitar & backing vocals
 Val Ium – bass guitar, backing vocals, and sarcasm
 Danny Jam Kavadlo – drums & percussion
 Recorded at Systems Two Recording, Brooklyn, NY
 Engineered by Michael Marciano
 Produced by Josh Silver
 Mastered by Rick Essig at Frankford/Wayne, NY

Atlantic Records version 
The band signed with Atlantic Records in 1996 and the new label re-released Number One in 1997. The Atlantic version of contained new artwork and a reworked lineup:

 Henry Font – lead vocals & rhythm guitars
 Burton Gans* – lead guitar
 Val Ium – bass guitar, backing vocals & cerebral torture
 Jeff McManus* – drums, percussion & gambling problems

However, the recording itself remained the same, so the liner notes included the following message:

References 

1996 albums